"The Gernsback Continuum" is a 1981 science fiction short story by American-Canadian author William Gibson, originally published in the anthology Universe 11 edited by Terry Carr. It was later  reprinted in Gibson's collection Burning Chrome, and in Mirrorshades, edited by Bruce Sterling. With some similarity to Gibson's later appraisal of Singapore for Wired magazine in Disneyland with the Death Penalty, as much essay as fiction, it depicts the encounters of an American photographer with the period futuristic architecture of the American 1930s when he is assigned to document it for fictional London publishers Barris-Watford, and the gradual incursion of its cinematic future visions into his world. The "Gernsback" of the title alludes to Hugo Gernsback, the pioneer of early 20th century American pulp magazine science fiction.

Plot summary 

Assigned to photograph 1930s period futuristic American architecture by London publishing figures Cohen and Dialta Downes, an American photographer begins to enter the worlds of his subject with increasing vividness. Characterised by Downes as 'American Streamlined Moderne', a "kind of alternate America...A 1980 that never happened, an architecture of broken dreams", or what Cohen calls 'Raygun Gothic', his encounters with a world of California gas stations, fifth run movie houses likened to "the temples of some lost sect", a utopian 'continuum' of flying wings and air cars, multi-lane highways, giant zeppelins and Aryan, distinctly American inhabitants, lead him to hallucination as the scenes of the period spill into reality. His US agent Kihn attributes this to what he calls 'semiotic ghosts', the remnants of mass culture in the collective unconscious, and advises immersion in a pulp diet of pornography and TV. In references to the architecture of Nazi Germany, the Hitler Youth and period sci-fi like Flash Gordon, Fritz Lang and H. G. Wells, the modernist vistas of the 'golden age' are contextualized in period political visions as the protagonist clings to a familiar and preferred postmodern present. Having completed the job, Barris-Watford's hired photographer retreats to San Francisco and books a plane to New York, still trying to rid himself of the nightmare vision in the current disasters of global news. An attendant tells him that the world scene “could be worse.” The photographer replies, “Or even worse, it could be perfect.”

Critical reception

In a review of Burning Chrome for Tangent magazine, Nader Elhefnawy observes Gibson's disposal of the idealised futures of the 1930s, comparing his critique to that of Moorcock and Pynchon:

Bruce Sterling declared:

Thomas Bredehoft, writing on Gibson's treatment of cyberpunk, cyberspace and the recurrence of agent Kihn in the author's fiction, suggests that the media and dystopian realities in which Kihn urges Gibson's character escape the idealism of his visions are symptomatic and in part caused by the worlds he photographs.

He draws parallels between Gibson's descriptions of 1930s futuristic design, the author's encounters with computer technology, and the cosmeticism of a vision of technology infused throughout Gibson's work and particularly in Neuromancer. Comparing the language of drug narratives, Gernsback's worlds of the future and cyberspace, he suggests a cyberpunk born of the dual influences of the golden age of the 1930s and 40s and the New Wave, arguing that the futurist utopianism derided in the likes of Gernsback is in fact one feature of a 'Gibsonian' cyberspace itself.

Peio Aguirre has compared The Gernsback Continuum to the concept of hauntology by Jacques Derrida

Adaptations
"The Gernsback Continuum" was adapted during 1993 as Tomorrow Calling, a short TV film by Tim Leandro for Film4 Productions. Originally shown on Channel 4, the film was also presented at the British Film Festival, 4–10 October 1996.

See also
 Dieselpunk
 Futurism
 Future Shock

Footnotes

External links
"The Gernsback Continuum" at the William Gibson Aleph
Burning Chrome and The Gernsback Continuum reviewed at Tangent magazine, 2007 
The Gernsback Continuum in full archived from American Heritage.com
Getting Out of the Gernsback Continuum by Andrew Ross, in Critical Inquiry Vol.17, No.2, 1991
The Gernsback Continuum: Cyberspace and Gibson's Mervyn Kihn Stories; T. A Bredehoft in Science Fiction Studies Vol.22, No.66, 1995

Cyberpunk short stories
Short stories by William Gibson